Adam Shaheen (born 13 October 1964) is a British-Canadian artist, animator, television producer and screenwriter. He is the founder and owner of Cuppa Coffee Studios where he developed and produced original programming. He was the executive producer of Cuppa Coffee's award-winning broadcast design and commercial studio.

Cuppa Coffee 
The studio won awards for its film and title work - namely Jane the Virgin, Sesame Street, Much Music, MTV, Nickelodeon, Noggin, Comedy Central. David Cronenberg's Existenz, Cosmopolis, Spider, Eastern Promises, A Dangerous Method and Maps to the Stars, and over 50 awards from the Broadcast Design Association and Promax.

Shaheen is a published author and record producer.

Shaheen has produced over 400 commercials and won over 150 International awards -  including 3 Gemini's/Canadian Screen Awards for his contribution to Canadian Animation and also the Prix Jeunesse, the prestigious international award given at Annecy. Shaheen is widely considered the single most awarded executive in the field of animation.

In September 2017, Cuppa Coffee celebrated its 25th Anniversary with Shaheen announcing "I've achieved all I've ever wanted to achieve creatively in animation and now I will put my efforts into live action" In a British interview, Shaheen cited having "achieved awards, created dozens of shows and hundreds of commercials, my talents in telling story has naturally gravitated to live action"

Shaheen opened Cuppa Coffee USA in 2018 and is based in Los Angeles, to focus on live action drama development. Shaheen is co-authoring a dramatic limited series set during WW1 (The Undefeated), and a feature film set during WWII, about Americans in Berlin in 1945. Shaheen continues to consult on animated TV series.

References

External links

British television producers
Canadian television producers
British animators
Canadian animators
British animated film producers
Canadian animated film producers
Artists from London
1964 births
Living people